Sanctuary, or Sanctuary: Lisa Gerrard, is a 2006 documentary film about life and work of Australian musician and singer Lisa Gerrard. It is directed by Clive Collier. The film was released for sale online in September 2006. It includes extensive interviews of Gerrard and also people she has collaborated with in her career, including Michael Mann, Hans Zimmer, Russell Crowe, Graeme Revell, Harry Gregson-Williams, Brendan Perry, Niki Caro and Pietro Scalia.

External links
 Sanctuary: Lisa Gerrard - A Portrait by Clive Collier Official Film Site

2006 films
Documentary films about singers
British documentary films
2006 documentary films
Documentary films about women in music
2000s English-language films
2000s British films